Jaz is small uninhabited island in the Adriatic Sea, Croatia.

Jaz is situated 55 m off the coast, halfway between towns of Primošten and Rogoznica. The highest peak of this island is approximately 44 m. It is famous for its proximity to the coast. This means visitors can cross over from the coast without the use of a boat, but with a towel in their hands.

References

Islets of Croatia
Islands of the Adriatic Sea
Uninhabited islands of Croatia
Landforms of Šibenik-Knin County